Sidmar Antônio Martins (born 13 June 1962) is a former Brazilian football player who played as a goalkeeper. He is currently head coach of Fujieda MYFC.

Club statistics

References

External links

geocities.jp

1962 births
Living people
Brazilian footballers
J1 League players
J3 League players
Guarani FC players
Esporte Clube Bahia players
Associação Portuguesa de Desportos players
Grêmio Foot-Ball Porto Alegrense players
Esporte Clube XV de Novembro (Piracicaba) players
Shimizu S-Pulse players
Fujieda MYFC players
Brazilian expatriate footballers
Expatriate footballers in Japan
Association football goalkeepers